In 1955, both the United States and the Soviet Union (USSR) announced plans for launching the world's first satellites during the International Geophysical Year (IGY) of 1957–58. Project Vanguard, proposed by the US Navy, won out over the US Army's Project Orbiter as the satellite and rocket design to be flown in the IGY. Development of Intercontinental Ballistic Missiles, the Atlas by the US and the R-7 by the USSR, accelerated, entering the design and construction phase.

Both the US and USSR continued to launch a myriad of sounding rockets to probe the outer reaches of Earth's atmosphere and to take quick glimpses of the sun beyond the obscuring layers of air. The Aerobee Hi, first launched in April, promised a comparatively low cost alternative to other high altitude sounding rockets. The State University of Iowa meanwhile experimented with balloon-launched rockoons on its fourth expedition into the Atlantic Ocean.

Space exploration highlights

Sounding Rockets

The Aerobee family of rockets expanded considerably this year, both in variety and capability. Able to probe the upper atmosphere, its $30,000 per flight price tag compared favorably to that of its high altitude contemporaries, the Viking and the Bumper; at least one 1955 Aerobee-Hi flight returned scientific data. Other, less capable, Aerobee rockets still lofted instruments beyond the  boundary of space (as defined by the World Air Sports Federation) returning spectra of the Sun in ultraviolet and investigating atmospheric airglow.

The Viking series of rockets wrapped up with the flight of Viking 12, launched 4 February 1955.

A number of sounding rockets based on the Nike booster (used as the first stage in various anti-aircraft missiles), were developed and launched. Just one, the 5 April Nike-Deacon flight, breached the limits of space. The Soviet Union launched three R-1E sounding rocket variants of its R-1 missile (a copy of the German V-2), all carrying dogs as biological payloads.

 (the mission date has not yet been determined)
 (see table below for details and citations)

Fourth Atlantic Rockoon expedition

Members of the State University of Iowa (SUI) physics department embarked September 1955 on their fourth naval expedition into the Atlantic Ocean to survey the distribution of cosmic rays and auroral radiation by latitude using balloon-launched rockets (rockoons). The team leader was Frank B. McDonald, formerly of the University of Minnesota. Their vessel was the USS Ashland, a World War 2 era Dock landing ship originally used to transport and launch landing craft and amphibious vehicles. Two research teams with the Naval Research Laboratory also sailed on the Ashland. In addition to the Deacon-equipped rockoons that had been used on the prior expeditions, the SUI team experimented with Loki I rockets launched from balloons. The new vehicle worked perfectly, the first being launched 23 September.

This set the stage for the most ambitious missions of the cruise: the launchings of two two-stage Loki I/Deacon rockoons. The first was a failure, the smaller Loki second stage failing to separate from the Deacon. On the second attempt, both stages fired properly. However, two and a half seconds after second stage ignition, telemetry from the rocket abruptly stopped. Had it reached its target altitude, Van Allen later stated, it might well have discovered the Van Allen Belts two and a half years before the missions of Explorer 1 and Explorer 3. As it turned out, no more Loki/Deacon missions were attempted.

Spacecraft development

Preparation for the International Geophysical Year (IGY)

The origin of the International Geophysical Year can be traced to the International Polar Years held in 1882–1883, then in 1932–1933 and most recently from March 2007 to March 2009. On 5 April 1950, several top scientists (including Lloyd Berkner, Sydney Chapman, S. Fred Singer, and Harry Vestine), met in James Van Allen's living room and suggested that the time was ripe to have a worldwide Geophysical Year instead of a Polar Year, especially considering recent advances in rocketry, radar, and computing. Berkner and Chapman proposed to the International Council of Scientific Unions that an International Geophysical Year (IGY) be planned for 1957–58, coinciding with an approaching period of maximum solar activity. In 1952, the IGY was announced.

In January 1955, Radio Moscow announced that the Soviet Union might be expected to launch a satellite in the near future. This announcement galvanized American space efforts; in the same month, the National Academy of Sciences' IGY committee established a Technical Panel on Rocketry to evaluate plans to orbit an American satellite. Already under consideration was Project Orbiter, an Army plan to use a slightly modified Redstone (a ) range surface-to-surface missile developed the prior year) combined with upper stages employing 31 Loki solid-propellant rockets could put a  satellite into orbit, which could be tracked optically.

On 26 May 1955, the U.S. National Security Council also endorsed a satellite program. On 8 June, United States Secretary of Defense Charles Wilson directed Assistant Secretary Donald A. Quarles to coordinate the implementation of a satellite program, with the United States Department of Defense providing the rocket and launch facilities, and the civilian IGY National Committee producing the satellite and its experimental package, the National Science Foundation mediating between the two agencies. A committee, under the chairmanship of Homer J. Stewart of Jet Propulsion Laboratory, was developed to manage the project to evaluate and choose between the available satellite orbiting options. Project Orbiter now had competition in the form of the Naval Research Laboratory (NRL) plan to develop an orbital capability for its Viking rocket (Project Vanguard), even though the Loki upper stage rockets had been replaced with higher powered Sergeants. On 28 July, confident that a satellite could be lofted during the IGY, President Dwight D. Eisenhower's press secretary, James Hagerty, announced that a satellite would officially be among the United States' contributions to the IGY. The Soviets responded four days later with their own announcement of a planned IGY satellite launch.

By 9 September, the Stewart Committee had chosen the NRL proposal over the Army's citing the Navy's impressive planned Minitrack communications technology and network as well as both the civilian nature and the greater growth potential of the Viking/Vanguard rocket. The contract authorizing the construction of two more Viking rockets (13 and 14) was expanded to include development of the Vanguard rockets. NRL received the assignment to develop the Vanguard satellite in early October.

United States

In January 1955, Convair was awarded a long-term government contract for the development of the Atlas, America's first ICBM, beginning Phase Three: detail design and development. With the increasing availability of smaller, lighter thermonuclear weapons, the Atlas design could reach a desired range of  while using just three engines (original plans had contemplated five). Work on the Atlas accelerated in response to a secret report made in February 1955 by James Rhyne Killian to the National Security Council on Soviet rocket progress; in December 1955, Atlas was made the highest-priority project in the nation. In addition, after the issuance of the Killian report, a second ICBM, the Titan, was authorized, along with the Thor Intermediate-range ballistic missile (IRBM), this latter rocket using many of the systems already being developed for Atlas. All three of these missiles were adapted into workhorse orbital delivery rockets, the Atlas offered as a backup alternative to both the Redstone and the Vanguard as an IGY launching vehicle.

Also authorized in the wake of the Killian report was the U.S. Army's Jupiter IRBM proposal, which was to be jointly developed by the U.S. Navy for use on vessels (the Navy dropped out of the project late the following year). The Jupiter also ultimately became a space launcher under the designation Juno II.

Soviet Union

Work then proceeded on an upgrade designated R-5M, with similar launch mass and range, but designed to carry a nuclear warhead. This rocket, which would be the world's first nuclear missile, was a stopgap weapon pending the development of an ICBM, the development of both of which had been decreed by the USSR Council of Ministers in late 1953.

This ICBM was the R-7, whose design began in 1954. Initially contemplated as a two-stage design, the R-7 ultimately employed a cluster of four strapon boosters around a central rocket (or "sustainer"). For the first time, Soviet engineers were developing a rocket with more than a single combustion chamber (in the case of the R-7, there were 32). This ambitious project was the joint effort of three design entities: OKB-1, responsible for the general hydraulic system, NII-885, managing the general electrical system, and OKB-456, developing the engines' layout and thrust sequence. In 1955, after the traditional launch pad proved to be unusable for the R-7, a plan was advanced to suspend the sustainer at the launch site, attaching the strapon cluster there; the entire assembly would be suspended by the launch facility rather than resting on the ground. The first test launches were planned for 1957. The site for these launches, decided 12 February 1955, was Ministry of Defense Scientific-Research and Test Firing Range No.5 (NIIP-5), located in the Kazakh Soviet Socialist Republic (now Kazakhstan) near the Syr-Darya river. The town of Baikonur grew to support the facility.

Though the R-7 was developed explicitly as a nuclear missile, OKB-1's head Sergei Korolev already had plans to utilize the rocket for delivering satellites into orbit. At a private meeting on 30 August 1955, Korolev proposed this possibility Vasily Ryabikov, chairman of the Military Industrial Meeting. This suggestion culminated in the governmental resolution of January 1956 calling for the production of the Soviet Union's first satellite.

Launches

January

|}

February

|}

March

|}

April

|}

May

|}

June

|}

July

|}

August

|}

September

|}

October

|}

November

|}

December

|}

Suborbital launch summary

By country

By rocket

See also
Timeline of spaceflight

References

Footnotes

1955 in spaceflight
Spaceflight by year